Jenness is a surname. Notable people with the surname include:

 Benning W. Jenness (1806–1879), United States senator from New Hampshire
 Diamond Jenness (1886–1969), anthropologist and explorer
 James M. Jenness (born 1946), businessman
 Linda Jenness (born 1941), politician
 Morgan Jenness, freelance dramaturg 
 Stephen Jenness (born 1990), field hockey player
 Theodora Robinson Jenness (1847-1935), American author, editor, missionary 
 Valerie Jenness (born 1963), academic

See also
 Jenness Farm, historic farm property in Rochester, New Hampshire
 Jenness Pond, water body in New Hampshire
 Jenness State Beach, state park in Rye, New Hampshire